Blue Silver is a hard bop composition written in 1948 by American jazz trumpet player Richard 'Blue' Mitchell.

Note: This is not the composition with the same title by Horace Silver that appeared on his album, The Jody Grind. See: jazz contrafact.

References 

1948 songs
Musical compositions